The women's 4 x 400 metres relay at the 1969 European Athletics Championships was held in Athens, Greece, at Georgios Karaiskakis Stadium on 19 September 1969.

Medalists

Results

Final
The official times were rounded to one-tenth of a second, with both first and second place credited with a new world record of 3:30.8.

19 September

Heats
19 September

Heat 1

Heat 2

Participation
According to an unofficial count, 45 athletes from 11 countries participated in the event.

 (4)
 (4)
 (4)
 (4)
 (4)
 (4)
 (4)
 (4)
 (5)
 (4)
 (4)

References

4 x 400 metres relay
4 x 400 metres relay at the European Athletics Championships
Euro